General Weaver may refer to:

Erasmus M. Weaver Jr. (1854–1920), U.S. Army major general
James B. Weaver (1833–1912), Union Army brevet brigadier general
James D. Weaver (1920–2003), U.S. Air Force brigadier general (posthumously promoted)
James R.N. Weaver (1888–1967), U.S. Army brigadier general
Paul A. Weaver (fl. 1960s–2020s), U.S. Air Force major general
Walter Reed Weaver (1885–1944), U.S. Army major general